Kirill Semyonov (born October 27, 1994) is a Russian professional ice hockey forward for Ak Bars Kazan of the Kontinental Hockey League (KHL).

Playing career
Semyonov played as a youth within hometown club, Avangard Omsk of the Kontinental Hockey League (KHL). Semyonov made his professional and KHL debut playing with Avangard Omsk during the 2013–14 KHL season.

During the 2015–16 season, Semyonov was traded by Omsk to Metallurg Novokuznetsk in exchange for Maksim Kazakov on 14 December 2015. In an increased role, Semyonov featured in the final 20 regular season games with Novokuznetsk, posting 6 points. In the following 2016–17 season, Semyonov enjoyed a break out season with Novokuznetsk, leading the team in scoring with 13 goals and 27 points through 60 games in what would be the club's final season in the KHL.

Semyonov remained in the KHL, returning to original club Avangard Omsk on a two-year contract on 9 June 2017. Emerging as a top-six scoring role forward, Semyonov increased his goal totals in four consecutive seasons, leading Avangard in scoring during the 2019–20 season with 16 goals and 46 points through 62 regular season games to represent Avangard at the 2020 KHL All-Star Game.

In the following 2020–21 season, Semyonov after contributing with 26 points in 60 regular season games, posted career best playoff appearances by featuring in 23 post-season games and collecting 4 goals and 9 points to help Avangard claim their first Gagarin Cup in franchise history with a 4-2 series win over CSKA Moscow.

As an undrafted free agent, Semyonov left the KHL and signed a one-year, entry-level deal with the Toronto Maple Leafs of the NHL for the 2021–22 season on 5 May 2021. After attending the Maple Leafs 2021 training camp, Semyonov was assigned to begin his first North American season with American Hockey League affiliate, the Toronto Marlies. Semyonov scored at a point-per-game pace with 1 goal and 8 assists in 9 contests before he was recalled to the Maple Leafs on 7 November 2021. He made his NHL debut with the Maple Leafs, appearing in a bottom six forward role in a 3-0 victory over the Philadelphia Flyers on 10 November 2021. He featured in 3 games with the Maple Leafs without registering a point before he was returned to the AHL on 30 November 2021. Unwilling to continue in the AHL with the Marlies, Semyonov opted mutually terminate his contract with the Maple Leafs and was placed on unconditional waivers on 2 December 2021.

On 6 December 2021, Semyonov as a free agent subsequently returned to Russia and rejoined previous club, Avangard Omsk, for the remainder of the 2021–22 season.

On 5 May 2022, having left Avangard as a free agent, Semyonov signed a two-year contract with Ak Bars Kazan.

International play

On 23 January 2022, Semyonov was named to the roster to represent Russian Olympic Committee athletes at the 2022 Winter Olympics.

Career statistics

Regular season and playoffs

International

Awards and honours

References

External links

1994 births
Living people
Ak Bars Kazan players
Avangard Omsk players
Metallurg Novokuznetsk players
Saryarka Karagandy players
Russian ice hockey forwards
Sportspeople from Omsk
Toronto Maple Leafs players
Toronto Marlies players
Undrafted National Hockey League players
Ice hockey players at the 2022 Winter Olympics
Medalists at the 2022 Winter Olympics
Olympic silver medalists for the Russian Olympic Committee athletes
Olympic medalists in ice hockey
Olympic ice hockey players of Russia